Muhammad Zakir Qureshi better known as Chef Zakir is a Pakistani television chef, host, hotelier and food personality who has appeared on cooking programs on Indus TV, Hum TV and Masala TV.  He is an expert on Pakistani cuisine as well as international cuisine.

Life and career
He was born as Muhammad Zakir Qureshi in Karachi, Pakistan on 16 February 1967. His father's name was Mr. Abdul Aziz Qureshi who was a great chef of his time. He studied at the Qulsoom Bai Valika School, Govt. Boys School of Santabad and Allama Iqbal College. He travelled to work and study in Dubai, Singapore, South Africa and Botswana.

He started his professional career in 1980 at the Sheraton Hotel in Karachi. He also worked in the Avari Hotel and the Pearl Continental Hotel in Karachi.

He first appeared on Indus TV. In 2006, he worked for Hum TV. Since 2007, he has hosted a show called Dawat on Masala TV.

He owns a Cz Restaurant, Block 7، Gulshan-e-Iqbal, Karachi, Karachi City, Sindh, Pakistan He is married with five children. His son Ahsan is also a television chef.

References

External links
 Official Website of Chef Zakir

Pakistani television hosts
Pakistani television chefs
Living people
People from Karachi
1967 births